The 1998 Laurence Olivier Awards were held in 1998 in London celebrating excellence in West End theatre by the Society of London Theatre.

Winners and nominees
Details of winners (in bold) and nominees, in each award category, per the Society of London Theatre.

Productions with multiple nominations and awards
The following 23 productions, including two ballets and two operas, received multiple nominations:

 7: Chicago
 5: Lady in the Dark
 4: King Lear and The Fix
 3: Amy's View, Beauty and the Beast, Damn Yankees, Kiss Me, Kate and Tom and Clem
 2: Chips with Everything, Closer, Enter the Guardsman, Falstaff, Hamlet, Hurlyburly, L'Allegro, il Penseroso ed il Moderato, Marlene, Othello, Palestrina, Paul Bunyan, Swan Lake, Three Hours after Marriage and The Invention of Love

The following four productions received multiple awards:

 2: Chicago, King Lear, Lady in the Dark and Three Hours after Marriage

See also
 52nd Tony Awards

References

External links
 Previous Olivier Winners – 1998

Laurence Olivier Awards ceremonies
Laurence Olivier Awards, 1998
Laurence Olivier Awards
Laurence Olivier Awards